The Grovabreen glacier is located in Vestland county, Norway. The glacier is part of Jostedalsbreen National Park, just south of the lake Jølstravatnet.

See also
List of glaciers in Norway

References

Glaciers of Vestland
Sunnfjord